Yannick Ecoeur (born 23 August 1981) is a Swiss ski mountaineer and mountain runner.

Ecoeur was born in Martigny VS. He started ski mountaineering in 2003 and has been member of the national team since 2005. At the 2020 Winter Youth Olympics he acted as Athlete Rolemodel for Ski Mountaineering.

Selected results

Ski mountaineering 
 2005:
 2nd, European Championship relay race (together with Alexander Hug, Christian Pittex and Jean-Yves Rey)
 10th, European Championship team race (together with Emmanuel Vaudan)
 2006:
 1st, Swiss Championship single race
 3rd, Trophée des Gastlosen, together with Florent Troillet
 9th, World Championship team race (together with Alain Rey)
 2007:
 2nd, European Championship relay race (together with Alain Rey, Florent Troillet and Alexander Hug)
 6th, European Championship team race (together with Alain Rey)
 2009:
 3rd, European Championship relay race (together with Florent Troillet, Marcel Marti and Pierre Bruchez)
 7th, European Championship team race (together with Marcel Marti)
 8th, European Championship single race
 2010:
 2nd, World Championship relay race (together with Florent Troillet, Martin Anthamatten and Pierre Bruchez)
 9th, World Championship team race (together with Marcel Marti)
 10th, World Championship single race
 2011:
 2nd, World Championship relay, together with Marcel Theux, Martin Anthamatten and Marcel Marti
 3rd, World Championship sprint
 7th, World Championship single race
 2012:
 1st, European Championship relay, together with Martin Anthamatten, Marcel Theux and Alan Tissières
 3rd, European Championship team, together with Martin Anthamatten
 4th, European Championship sprint
 4th, World Championship vertical, combined ranking
 9th, European Championship single
 2nd, Patrouille de la Maya, together with Martin Anthamatten and Florent Troillet

Trofeo Mezzalama 

 2005: 5th, together with Stéphane Gay and Didier Moret
 2007: 8th, together with Alain Rey and Ernest Farquet
 2009: 6th, together with Marcel Marti and Martin Anthamatten
 2011: 5th, together with Martin Anthamatten and Marcel Marti

Patrouille des Glaciers 

 2006: 3rd (and 1st in international military teams ranking), together with Cpl Rico Elmer and Pvt E-2 Florent Troillet
 2008: 7th (and 1st in the international military teams ranking), together with Garde-frontière Pierre Bruchez and Garde-frontière Marcel Marti
 2010: 1st, together with Martin Anthamatten and Florent Troillet

Pierra Menta 

 2006: 8th, together with Alain Rey
 2008: 7th, together with Reynold Ginier
 2009: 9th, together with Pierre Bruchez
 2010: 5th, together with Martin Anthamatten
 2011: 6th, together with Valentin Favre
 2012: 6th, together with Yannick Buffet

Running 
 2008:
 2nd, Dérupe Vercorin

External links 
 Yannick Ecoeur at Skimountaineering.org

References 

1981 births
Living people
Swiss male ski mountaineers
Swiss military patrol (sport) runners
Swiss male long-distance runners
Swiss mountain runners
People from Martigny
Sportspeople from Valais